The 2022 ACB Playoffs, also known as 2022 Liga Endesa Playoffs for sponsorship reasons, is the postseason tournament of the ACB's 2021–22 season, which began on 18 September 2021. The playoffs started on May 24 after the EuroLeague Final Four, which was played on May 19–21, and ended on June 19.
 
Barça was the defending champion, but lost the final series 1–3 to Real Madrid, who won a record 36th title (14th in the ACB era), ending a 3-year drought after their last triumph in 2019.

Format
At the end of the regular season, the eight teams with the most wins qualify for the playoffs. The seedings are based on each team's record.

The bracket is fixed; there is no reseeding. The quarterfinals are best-of-three series; the team that wins two games advances to the next round. This round is in a 1–1–1 format. From the semifinals onward, the rounds are best-of-five series; the team that wins three games advances to the next round. These rounds, including the Finals, are in a 2–2–1 format. Home court advantage in any round belong to the higher-seeded team.

Playoff qualifying
On April 10, 2022, Barça became the first team to clinch a playoff spot.

Bracket
Teams in bold advanced to the next round. The numbers to the left of each team indicate the team's seeding, the numbers to the right indicate the result of games including result in bold of the team that won in that game, and the numbers furthest to the right indicate the number of games the team won in that round.

Quarterfinals
All times are in Central European Summer Time (UTC+02:00)

Barça v Gran Canaria

This was the fourth playoff meeting between these two teams, with Barça winning the previous three meetings.

Real Madrid v Baxi Manresa

This was the fifth playoff meeting between these two teams, with Real Madrid winning three of the first four meetings.

Valencia Basket v Bitci Baskonia

This was the sixth playoff meeting between these two teams, with Bitci Baskonia winning three of the first five meetings.

Joventut v Lenovo Tenerife

This was the second playoff meeting between these two teams, with Joventut winning the first meeting.

Semifinals
All times are in Central European Summer Time (UTC+02:00)

Barça v Joventut

This was the 14th playoff meeting between these two teams, with Barça winning 10 of the first 13 meetings.

Real Madrid v Bitci Baskonia

This was the 12th playoff meeting between these two teams, with Real Madrid winning eight of the first 11 meetings.

Finals
All times are in Central European Summer Time (UTC+02:00)

This was the 21st playoff meeting between these two teams, with each team winning 10 out of the first 20 meetings.

References

External links
 Official website 

2021
playoffs